The Big West Conference women's basketball tournament is the conference championship tournament in basketball for the Big West Conference.  It is a single-elimination tournament and seeding is based on regular season records.  The winner, declared conference champion, receives the conference's automatic bid to the NCAA Women's Division I Basketball Championship.  The women's tournament has been played every year since 1983.

Tournament champions

Performance by school

Teams in bold represent current conference members

See also
 Big West Conference men's basketball tournament

References

https://www.webcitation.org/6843EfNN0?url=http://www.bigwest.org//story.asp?story_id=15959